Frankie Laine Time is a summer replacement television series that replaced Arthur Godfrey and His Friends on CBS. It ran July - September 1955 and August - September 1956.

The variety series included star Frankie Laine singing songs with other singers, dancers, and comedians. The 1955 version featured The Lynn Duddy Singers, The James Starbuck Dancers, and The Jimmy Carroll Orchestra. Their counterparts in 1956 were The Mellolarks, The Edith Barstow Dancers, and The Russ Case Orchestra.

Guests on the series included Duke Ellington, Ella Fitzgerald and many other celebrities of the era.

Related programs 
Prior to this, Frankie Laine hosted The Frankie Laine Show, a 1954 series which aired in first-run syndication in a half-hour time-slot. A public domain episode of this version appears on the Internet Archive and runs 26 minutes with commercials removed. Unlike most variety series of the era, this show was produced directly on film, in the manner similar to Liberace. Both Liberace and The Frankie Laine Show were productions of Guild Films, also responsible for Life with Elizabeth and several other syndicated series of the 1950s.

The syndicated version was exported to Australia during the late-1950s, where it aired on ABC in Sydney and Melbourne.

A 1950 pilot called The Frankie Laine Show was produced prior to both of these shows, but wasn't picked up.

References

External links
Frankie Laine Time on IMDb
September 12 1956, episode of Frankie Laine Time at the Internet Archive
September 5 1956, episode of Frankie Laine Time at the Internet Archive
Episode guide for 1956 version of Frankie Laine Time

Black-and-white American television shows
1954 American television series debuts
1956 American television series endings
1950s American variety television series
CBS original programming